María del Carmen García Maura (born 15 September 1945) is a Spanish actress. In a career that has spanned six decades, she has starred in films such as Women on the Verge of a Nervous Breakdown, ¡Ay Carmela!, Common Wealth, and Volver. She holds the record for most Goya Awards for Best Leading Actress (with three). She also won a Cesar Award in 2013 and a Cannes Film Festival Award in 2006.

Early life
Maura was born in Madrid to Salvador García Santa-Cruz and Carmen Maura Arenzana. Her great-grandfather was the Count of Fuente Nueva de Arenzana, who lived in the Palace of Arenzana in Madrid, currently the embassy of France. Her other great grandfather from her mother's side was the artist Bartolome Maura Montaner, brother of Antonio Maura, a former prime minister of Spain on five occasions and a noted orator.

Maura studied philosophy and literature at the École des Beaux-Arts in Paris. From 1964 to 1970, she was married to a lawyer, Francisco Forteza, with whom she has two children, Carmen and Pablo. Later she had a long relationship with Antonio Moreno Rubio, that ended in 1995 when she discovered he had defrauded her, causing bankruptcy.

Career
Maura began her career as a cabaret singer.
Maura's film career was launched in 1970 with an appearance in the film The Man in Hiding. This was followed by a major role in the 1977 film Tigres de papel. Although Maura has played dramatic roles, she is often noted for her comedic roles in films like Sal gorda (1984), Sé infiel y no mires con quién (1985) or Tata mía (1986).

Maura appeared in the first film by Pedro Almodóvar, Pepi, Luci, Bom y otras chicas del montón, in 1980. They went on to collaborate on five additional films in the 1980s, the last of which was Women on The Verge of a Nervous Breakdown (1988), for which she was awarded the European Film Award "Felix" for best actress.

Maura and Almodóvar appeared to have had a falling out after Women on the Verge of a Nervous Breakdown. They did not work together for over a decade, but joined forces again in 2006 for Volver. 'Volver' means 'Return' in Spanish, and one of the many returns the title alludes to is Maura's return to Almodovar's movies. The female cast of "Volver" won a collective prize for Best Actress at the 2006 Cannes Film Festival.

Maura also appeared in 800 Bullets where she played the mother of the boy who is the main character of the story. Kevin Severson is her son.

Maura is cited as a gay icon for the role of a transsexual she played in Almodóvar's Law of Desire, strengthening her image as a strong woman who is never afraid to break through boundaries.

Maura has won more Goya Awards for Best Leading Actress than any other actress in the history of Spanish film.

She won the "Locarno Excellence Award" in 2007 for all her cinematographic career.

Maura has worked under the orders of major directors like Almodovar, Ford Coppola, Amos Gitai, Yasmina Reza, Alejandro Agresti, Carlos Saura, Étienne Chatiliez and Álex de la Iglesia.

Filmography

Film

Television

Awards and nominations

Cannes Film Festival

César Award

European Film Awards

Goya Awards

Locarno Festival

San Sebastián International Film Festival

Fotogramas de Plata
 2007-Nominated: Best Movie Actress for Volver (2006)
 2001-Won: Best Movie Actress for La comunidad (2000).
 1999-Won: Best TV Actress for A las once en casa (1998).
 1994-Nominated: Best Movie Actress for Sombras en una batalla (1993)
 1993-Nominated: Best Movie Actress for "La reina anónima" and also Entre el cielo y la tierra (1992)
 1991-Won: Best Movie Actress for ¡Ay Carmela! (1990)
 1991-Nominated: Best TV Actress for La mujer de tu vida (1990)
 1989-Won: Best Movie Actress for Mujeres al borde de un ataque de nervios (1988)
 1988-Nominated: Best Movie Actress for La ley del deseo (1987)
 1987-Nominated: Best Movie Actress for Tata mía (1986) and also Matador (1986)
 1986-Nominated: Best Movie Actress for Sé infiel y no mires con quién (1985) and Extramuros (1985)
 1985-Won: Best Movie Actress for ¿Qué he hecho yo para merecer esto? (1984)
 1982-Won: Best Performance in a Television series for Esta noche (1981)

Honours 
 : Knight of the Order of Arts and Letters (1996).
 : Dame Grand Cross of the Civil Order of Alfonso X, the Wise (09/10/2015).

References

External links
 
 Bilingual forum created by young fans

1945 births
Living people
Actresses from Madrid
Spanish television presenters
Spanish film actresses
European Film Award for Best Actress winners
Best Actress Goya Award winners
Best Supporting Actress Goya Award winners
Cannes Film Festival Award for Best Actress winners
Best Supporting Actress César Award winners
20th-century Spanish actresses
21st-century Spanish actresses
Chevaliers of the Ordre des Arts et des Lettres
Recipients of the Civil Order of Alfonso X, the Wise
Spanish women television presenters
Chicas Almodóvar